Walter Jacob Cudzik (February 21, 1932 – December 11, 2005) was an American football center in the National Football League for the Washington Redskins.  He also played in the American Football League for the Boston Patriots and the Buffalo Bills.

College
Cudzik played college football at Purdue University.

NFL
Cudzik was drafted in the eighteenth round of the 1954 NFL Draft by the Washington Redskins, where he played up to 1959.

AFL
Cudzik was taken by the Boston Patriots in their inaugural season of 1960, where he played up to 1963. In his final year (1964), Cudzik became a member of the Buffalo Bills as their starting center, replacing Al Bemiller, who was moved to right offensive guard to accommodate him. That year, the Bills scored 400 points (28.6 points/game), 1st among 8 teams in the AFL, and won the AFL championship under head coach Lou Saban. In 1965, Cudzick was replaced by Dave Behrman.

References

1932 births
2005 deaths
American football centers
Boston Patriots players
Buffalo Bills players
Players of American football from Chicago
Purdue Boilermakers football players
Washington Redskins players
American Football League players